Ted Berry (1905–2000) was an American politician.

Ted Berry is also the name of:

Ted Berry (basketball) (born 1972), American basketball player

See also
Edward Berry (disambiguation)